Kevin Mohammed Bin Issahaku (born October 25, 1990) is a Ghanaian footballer who last played for Atlanta Silverbacks in the NASL.

Career

Professional
Issahaku spent time with NPSL side Atlanta Silverbacks Reserves in 2013 and 2014. He moved to El Salvadorian club FAS in 2014 before returning to Atlanta in 2015.

References

1987 births
Living people
Ghanaian footballers
Atlanta Silverbacks players
Association football defenders
Soccer players from Georgia (U.S. state)
North American Soccer League players
People from Tamale, Ghana